{|
{{Infobox ship image
|Ship image= USS Paiute.jpg
|Ship image size= 350px
|Ship caption= Paiute in July 1965
}}

|}

She served a total of 44 years before being scrapped.

 Ship History 
After her commissioning in August 1945, Paiute was assigned salvage, towing and logistics duties throughout the North Atlantic Ocean, and operated from her home port at Norfolk, Virginia into 1953. In 1948, she towed USS Texas (BB-35) to Galveston, Texas. In September 1953, Paiute's home port was changed to Balboa, Canal Zone, where she carried out salvage operations and provided services to the fleet under the operational control of Commander Panama Sector, Caribbean Sea Frontier. Here she also operated the Diving School for second class divers at the Rodman Naval Station, Canal Zone.  She became the only ship of her class to display a Golden "E" on her gun mount for five consecutive years of outstanding accuracy. Paiute underwent a Line-crossing ceremony on 11 November 1955.

 Vietnam War 
During the Cuban Missile Crisis of 1962, Paiute carried out patrol assignments, and following the isolation of the Guantanamo naval base by the Castro Government, she supplied much needed water by towing water barges from the States, until a desalinization plant was installed and operational.

In 1965, she delivered fuel barges to the Dominican Republic during the hot political crisis there. She was on Prime Recovery Station One during the Gemini 6 and 7 manned space flights, and for Gemini 8 in 1966. Paiute moved to the New England area to provide services through 1967, returning to Guantanamo at the year's end. On 19 November, Paiute underwent another Line-crossing ceremony During 1968, she participated in several major salvage operations and fleet exercises. In the fall, she was again on recovery station for the Apollo 7 space shot. During February 1969, Paiute was awaiting splashdown of Apollo 9.

 Post-War 
On 23 August 1985, Paiute was decommissioned at Naval Station Mayport, Florida. She was later recommissioned on 30 September 1988.

 Fate 
On 7 August 1992, Paiute was decommissioned for the second and final time following the end of the Persian Gulf War. She was struck from the Naval Register on 14 February 1995, and transferred to the Maritime Administration on 29 December 1997, for disposal. Paiute'' was scrapped in 2003.

Ship Awards

References

External links 
, NavSourceOnline: ATF-159
 National Association of Fleet Tug Sailors: ATF-159
 ATF-159 Crew Roster
 U.S.S. PAIUTE Ship Cap
 VetFriends, PAIUTE ATF-159
 NavyBuddies.com, U.S.S. PAIUTE
 TogetherWeServed, U.S.S. PAIUTE (ATF-159)

 

Abnaki-class tugs
1945 ships
Ships built in Charleston, South Carolina